Otto Maximilian Hitzfeld (7 May 1898 – 6 December 1990) was a German general during World War II. He was listed as a recipient of the Knight’s Cross with Oak Leaves and Swords by the West German Association of Knight's Cross Recipients. He is the uncle of retired football manager Ottmar Hitzfeld.

Career

Hitzfeld received command of the 102nd Infantry Division in April 1943. He was promoted to Generalleutnant early November 1943 and had to turn over command of the Division. He then took command of the infantry school in Döberitz and again turned over command on 1 November 1944. Hitzfeld was given command of the LXVII Army Corps, which he led in the Battle of the Bulge. He was promoted to General of the Infantry on 1 March 1945 and made commanding general of the LXVII Army Corps.

He became commander of the 11th Army in April 1945. He declared Göttingen, which was crowded with refugees, as an open city. He was taken prisoner of war by American forces on 19 April 1945 from which he was released on 12 May 1947. He received news that he had been awarded the Knight's Cross of the Iron Cross with Oak Leaves and Swords after his release from captivity.

Awards
 Iron Cross (1914) 2nd Class (5 November 1915 & 1st Class (5 September 1916))
 Clasp to the Iron Cross (1939) 2nd Class (25 August 1940) & 1st Class (15 August 1941)
 Officers Cross of the Order of the Crown with Swords (22 June 1942)
 Knight's Cross of the Iron Cross with Oak Leaves and Swords
 Knight's Cross on 30 October 1941 as Oberstleutnant and commander of Infanterie-Regiment 213
 65th Oak Leaves on 17 January 1942 as Oberstleutnant and commander of Infanterie-Regiment 213
 158th Swords on 9 May 1945 as General der Infanterie and commanding general of the LXVII. Armeekorps

Notes

References

Citations

Bibliography

 
 
 
 

1898 births
1990 deaths
German Army generals of World War II
Generals of Infantry (Wehrmacht)
Recipients of the Knight's Cross of the Iron Cross with Oak Leaves and Swords
Recipients of the clasp to the Iron Cross, 1st class
Reichswehr personnel
20th-century Freikorps personnel
German Army personnel of World War I
German prisoners of war in World War II held by the United States
Military personnel from Baden-Württemberg